Famine in Somalia may refer to:

1992 famine in Somalia, which killed 300,000 people in Somalia
2011 East Africa drought, which killed 260,000 people in Somalia

Somalia
History of Somalia